Kodi is a village in the Bhopal district of Madhya Pradesh, India. It is located in the Huzur tehsil and the Phanda block.

Demographics 

According to the 2011 census of India, Kodi has 45 households. The literacy rate of the village is 66.97%.

References 

Villages in Huzur tehsil